"Biking" is a song by American singer-songwriter Frank Ocean, released as a single on the third episode of Blonded Radio. It features guest vocals from American rappers Jay-Z and Tyler, the Creator. On 15 May 2017, a solo version of the track was released, following the sixth episode of Blonded Radio. It was featured in Season 2 of the HBO television series Insecure.

Background
"Biking" followed the release of two other Frank Ocean songs: "Slide" and "Chanel". The song was produced by Frank Dukes, Jarami, and Caleb Laven.

Charts

Release history

References

2017 singles
2017 songs
Frank Ocean songs
Jay-Z songs
Tyler, the Creator songs
Songs written by Frank Ocean
Songs written by Jay-Z
Songs written by Frank Dukes
Songs written by Tyler, the Creator
Song recordings produced by Frank Dukes